Pebble Hills High School is a school in El Paso, Texas, United States. It is the newest high school in the Socorro Independent School District. The campus officially opened its doors on July 1, 2015 serving 9th, 10th, 11th, and 12th grade students. The school mascot is the Spartan. The school colors are teal and desert orange.

Academics
The Sparta Business Academy will offer students a four-year program in business and finance with an opportunity to earn an associate degree in collaboration with El Paso Community College, internships and other real-world experiences.

External links
 Pebble Hills High School

Socorro Independent School District high schools
High schools in El Paso, Texas